Rosa 'Chicago Peace' (also known as JOHnago) is a hybrid tea rose cultivar,  a sport of the well-known 'Peace' rose,  discovered by Stanley Johnston, and introduced into the United States in 1956 by Star Roses. 'Chicago Peace' was the recipient of the Portland Gold Medal in 1962.

Description
'Chicago Peace' is a tall, upright shrub, 4 to 7 ft (121–213 cm) in height with a 2 to 3 ft (60–90 cm) spread. Blooms are very large, with an average diameter of 6 in (15.24 cm). Flowers are a blend of pink, yellow and orange, and have a mild fragrance.  Blooms are high-centered, very full (40+ petals) and have a cupped bloom form. Flowers are borne mostly solitary, with large, glossy, dark green, leathery foliage. The plant blooms in flushes from spring through autumn, and is sometimes prone to blackspot in autumn. It thrives in USDA zone 7 and warmer. 'Chicago Peace' was used to hybridize two child plants, the hybrid tea roses: 'Don Charlton' (1991) and 'Desert Peace' (1991).

Awards 
 Portland Gold Medal, (1962)

See also
Garden roses
Rose Hall of Fame
All-America Rose Selections
List of Award of Garden Merit roses

References

Chicago Peace